Fort ( (full name), НВО "Форт" (short name)) is a Ukrainian weapons manufacturer from Vinnytsia, Ukraine.

History
In 1991, a new company was formed to design and manufacture small arms for Ukrainian Interior Ministry, Security Service and State Border Service of Ukraine. At the opening of Ukraine's only facility serially manufacturing small arms at Fort in March 1998, association officials announced that the plant in Vinnytsia, which over ₴5 million (about $1.2 million) had been invested in over two years, was capable of large-scale production of small arms. The plant launched serial production of the Fort 12 pistol ordered primarily by the Ukrainian Interior Ministry. Pistol samples were also sent to Uzbekistan as an advance order, and to Russia. At the opening, Fort director Viktor Pisarenko said that its design bureau had developed and prepared for production 8 models of short-barreled weapons and 4 models of long-barreled weapons. "Weapons from Vinnytsia surpass analogs, for instance the Makarov pistol, in many respects," he said.

By May 1998, Ukrainian Interior Ministry formations started receiving the first Fort-12 pistols manufactured in Vinnytsia. According to Fort chief engineer Evgeniy Bokovoj, all of Ukraine's army and police forces are supplied by the plant's output. By March 2014, the plant developed over a dozen pistol and gun modifications, some of which were demonstrated at the IDEX-1999, IDEX-2001 and IDEF-2001 international arms exhibitions.

According to media reports, an agreement was signed in October 2000 for the delivery of a batch of Fort pistols to Uzbekistan. So far, it is the only country to which new Ukrainian small arms have been delivered, according to official press reports.

In October 2008, RPC Fort and Israel Weapon Industries reached an agreement to allow Fort to license-manufacture in Ukraine firearms such as the Tavor rifle system, the Negev light machinegun, and the Galatz sniper rifle, all of which were displayed at Fort's website as of early 2009.

The company has offered gun modernization services to upgrade AK-47, AK-74 and AKS-74 assault rifles to modern standards by adding picatinny rails to install scopes, foregrips and bipods with new pistol grips and buttstocks

Products

Firearms 
 Pistols:
 Fort-5
 Fort-12 (Fort-12-00, Fort-12-02 and Fort-12N variants)
 Fort-14 (Fort-14-00, Fort-14TP and Fort-14PP variants)
 Fort-15
 Fort-17
 Fort-20
 Fort-21 (Fort-21.01, Fort-21.02 and Fort-21.03 variants)
 Fort-28

 International Practical Shooting Confederation (IPSC) sport pistols:Sokil
Berkut
Kobra

 Pump-action shotguns:FORT-500 (FORT-500A, FORT-500M and FORT-500T variants)

 Rifles: single-shot bolt-action .22LR cadet rifles TOZ-8 OPF and TOZ-12 OPF
 several variants of self-loading AKM carbines - "Fort-201" (AKMS-MF with AKMS folding stock), "Fort-202" (AKMS-MF with new metal folding stock), "Fort-205" (AKM-MF with AKM wooden stock), "Fort-206" (AKMT-MF with black plastic handguard and new telescoping stock)
 several variants of self-loading SKS carbines - SKS-MF (Soviet SKS without bayonet) and "Fort-207" (Soviet SKS with black plastic handguard and new telescoping stock)
 several variants of Tavor TAR-21 (Fort-221, Fort-222, Fort-223, Fort-224)
 several variants of IWI Galil ACE (Fort-227, Fort-228, Fort-229)

 Sniper rifles: "Fort-301" (Galatz sniper rifle)

 Machine guns: Fort-401

 Grenade launcher:'''
 Fort-600

Non-lethal pistols
Fort-5R
Fort-6R
Fort-10R
Fort-12R
Fort-12RM
Fort-12T
Fort-13R
Fort-17R
Fort-17T
Fort-18R
Fort-D

Gas pistols
 Fort-5G and Fort-12G

Equipment 
 Police batons, handcuffs, etc.

See also
Mayak (:uk:Завод «Маяк» (Київ))
Zbroyar (:uk:Zbroyar)

References

External links
 RPC Fort web site

Firearm manufacturers of Ukraine
Defence companies of Ukraine
Manufacturing companies established in 1991
Buildings and structures in Vinnytsia
Ukrainian companies established in 1991
Government-owned companies of Ukraine